"Lark on My Go-Kart" is a song by American hip hop recording artist Asher Roth,  released on March 24, 2009 as the second single from his debut studio album Asleep In the Bread Aisle. The song was produced by Oren Yoel & David Appleton.

Music video
The music video was directed by Ryan Maloney. The video is animated, featuring an animated Asher doing various things mentioned in the lyrics, such as driving a go-kart, playing Mario Kart Wii, smashing pumpkins, hanging out at the bread aisle, etc.

Charts

References

2009 singles
Asher Roth songs
Songs written by Asher Roth
2009 songs
Universal Motown Records singles
Song recordings produced by Oren Yoel